The Port Erin Breakwater Railway was a construction line built in Port Erin on the Isle of Man in 1863 and had the distinction of being the first steam railway on the island, as well as the only broad gauge line.  The locomotive was named Henry B. Loch after the then lieutenant governor of the island.  Some photographs exist of the construction and locomotive but it is not known what became of any of the stock and assumed that it was returned to the UK upon completion of the project.

See also
Transport on the Isle of Man

References

1863 establishments in the United Kingdom
Railway lines in the Isle of Man
7 ft gauge railways